Blumenthal is a hamlet in the Canadian province of Saskatchewan.

History 
It was founded by Plautdietsch-speaking Russian Mennonites.

Demographics 

References

Designated places in Saskatchewan
Organized hamlets in Saskatchewan
Rosthern No. 403, Saskatchewan
Division No. 15, Saskatchewan